Fremlin is a British surname and may refer to:

People
 Alfred Fremlin (1832–1915), Australian politician
 Celia Fremlin (1914–2009), British author
 John H. Fremlin (1913–1995), nuclear physicist

Other uses
 Fremlin's Brewery, a brewery in Maidstone, Kent, England
 Fremlin Walk, an outdoor shopping centre in Maidstone, Kent, England
 Fremlin (Dungeons & Dragons), a creature in Dungeons & Dragons